Steele Center is an unincorporated community in Somerset Township, Steele County, Minnesota, United States.  The community is located south of Owatonna near the junction of Steele County Roads 3 and 45, and 68th Street.

References

Unincorporated communities in Steele County, Minnesota
Unincorporated communities in Minnesota